= Pijar =

PIJAR (Pusat Informasi dan Jaringan Aksi Reformasi / Information Centre and Action Network for Reform - Pijar also stands for 'flame') was an active player in the Indonesian struggle for democracy in 1998.

After succeeding with ending President Suharto's authoritarian rule on May 20, 2001, PIJAR's attention shifted towards the possible trial of Suharto and his successor Habibie at the International Court of Justice. Later, though already fading in its glory, PIJAR fought for the independence of Timor Leste, which finally gained independence in 2002.

In its pre-Suharto years, PIJAR organized most of its activities through email communication in order to escape possible prosecution.

Current activities of PIJAR are unknown.
